Ortner can refer to:

People
 Eric Ortner, an American news producer
 Erwin Ortner (born 1947), Austrian choral conductor
 Hans Ortner, an Austrian canoe racer
 Jon Ortner, an American photographer
 Richard Ortner, president of the Boston Conservatory
 Sherry Ortner, a cultural anthropologist

Other
 11681 Ortnera main-belt minor planet named for Johannes Ortner
 Ortner's syndrome, a rare cardiovocal disorder
 Ortner, Lancashire, a village in Lancashire, England